Omar Djelloul Rezgane (born 4 November 1981 in France) is a French retired footballer.

Scotland
Awarded a three-month contract with Hamilton Academical until early 2007, Rezgane was red carded on debut 36 minutes in.

References

External links 
at ZeroZero
at Footballdatabsse.eu

Association football defenders
TVEC Les Sables-d'Olonne players
Hamilton Academical F.C. players
SC Abbeville players
CS Avion players
Partick Thistle F.C. players
Expatriate footballers in Scotland
French footballers
French expatriate footballers
French sportspeople of Algerian descent
Thouars Foot 79 players
Vendée Poiré-sur-Vie Football players
1981 births
Living people